Shupeng Ah Vui (born 4 December 1997) is a Samoan athlete. He has represented Samoa at the Pacific Games and Commonwealth Games.

Ah Vui is from Siusega. He competed in the 100 meters at the 2018 Commonwealth Games on the Gold Coast in Australia, and set a personal best, but came last in his heat. At the 2019 Pacific Games in Apia he won silver in the 4 × 100 metres relay.

References

Living people
1997 births
People from Apia
Samoan male sprinters
Commonwealth Games competitors for Samoa
Athletes (track and field) at the 2018 Commonwealth Games